Tom Griffin (February 14, 1946 – March 20, 2018) was a playwright. His most successful work is The Boys Next Door, while other plays include Amateurs, Einstein and The Polar Bear, Pasta, and Mrs. Sedgewick's Head.

References

External links 
doollee.com, the Playwrights Database
The Boys Next Door Review

21st-century American dramatists and playwrights
1946 births
2018 deaths
20th-century American dramatists and playwrights